Gabriel Antonio Ortiz Tello (born 8 December 1981) is a Mexican race walker who specializes in  races.

He competed at the 2004 and 2006 World Race Walking Cups, and finished fourth at the Central American and Caribbean Games. He also competed at the 2007 World Championships, but was disqualified there.

Competition record

References

1981 births
Living people
Mexican male racewalkers
21st-century Mexican people